Australian Comforts Fund (ACF) was an Australian umbrella organisation for voluntary bodies set up after the outbreak of World War I. Many men and women worked at the ACF, including Alice Berry and Cyril Docker in WW2.

World War I 
The Australian Comforts Fund was established on 24 August 1916.

The ACF provided 12 million mugs of tea for soldiers in the trenches during the course of the war.

The Australian Comforts Fund was dissolved on 16 April 1920.

World War II 
The Australian Comforts Fund was re-established in January 1940 to assist with World War II.

The Australian Comforts Fund was dissolved once more on 27 June 1946.

See also 
 Queensland Soldiers' Comforts Fund

References

External links 

 Australian Comforts Fund Souvenir Collection at the Australian War Memorial

Australia in World War I
Australia in World War II
1916 establishments in Australia